The Ely-Criglar House (also known as the Francis R. Ely House) is a historic site in Marianna, Florida. It is located at 242 West Lafayette Street. On December 27, 1972, it was added to the U.S. National Register of Historic Places. Built by slaves from native limestone, the Greek Revival structure was completed c. 1840, as the Manor House for Francis R. Ely's  cotton plantation. "Ely Corner" is the site of The Battle of Marianna, where Federal troops attacked in September 1864 during the American Civil War. Defending the town against the enemy were old men and boys, too old or too young for regular military service and those furloughed or home due to illness.

The Battle of Marianna began at a barricade erected by the old men and boys at Ely's Corner, the southwest corner of the property, at the junction of St. Andrews Bay Road and Campbellton Road.

References

External links
Jackson County listings at Florida's Office of Cultural and Historical Programs

 Historical Marker Database - Ely-Criglar House

Houses on the National Register of Historic Places in Florida
Houses in Jackson County, Florida
Historic American Buildings Survey in Florida
National Register of Historic Places in Jackson County, Florida
Greek Revival architecture in Florida